Chelon bispinosus (Cape Verde mullet) is a fish of the family Mugilidae. It is one of seven species in the genus Chelon. It is endemic to waters near Cape Verde in the east central Atlantic Ocean. This species is found in the neritic zone.

Description
This species reaches a maximum length of 15 cm.

It is oviparous like other members of its genus.

References

Thomson, J.M., 1990. Mugilidae. pp. 855–859. In J.C. Quero, J.C. Hureau, C. Karrer, A. Post and L. Saldanha (eds.) Check-list of the fishes of the eastern tropical Atlantic (CLOFETA). JNICT, Lisbon; SEI, Paris; and UNESCO, Paris. Vol. 2. (Ref. 7399).

Chelon
Fish described in 1825
Taxa named by Sarah Bowdich Lee